Chaenactis cusickii is a North American species of flowering plants in the aster family known by the common name Morning brides or Cusick's pincushion. It has been found only in southeastern Oregon and southwestern Idaho.

Description
Chaenactis cusickii is a small perennial rarely more than 15 cm (6 inches) tall. Each branch produces 1-5 (occasionally more) flower heads each containing white or pale pink disc florets but no ray florets.

The species is named for American botanist William Conklin Cusick  (1842-1922).

References

External links
Steens Mountain Wildflowers, Cusicks Pincushion, Chaenactis cusickii  photo
Portland State University,  Environmental Science and Management Rae Selling Berry Seed Bank & Plant Conservation Program, Chaenactis cusickii Oregon distribution map
Oregon Flora Image Project, Chaenactis cusickii photos
photo of herbarium specimen at New York Botanical Garden, collected in Oregon

cusickii
Flora of Idaho
Flora of Oregon
Plants described in 1912
Flora without expected TNC conservation status